Jošanička Banja is a spa town located in the municipality of Raška, southwestern Serbia. As of 2011 census, it has a population of 1,036 inhabitants.

Trivia
In 500 BC, Hellenistic pottery including Megarian bowls were excavated in the town.

Notable individuals
 German, Serbian Patriarch

See also 
 List of spa towns in Serbia

References

External links 

Populated places in Raška District
Spa towns in Serbia